Choti Si Zindagi (lit:A short life) is a Pakistani drama serial that was first aired on 27 September 2016 replacing Zara Yaad Kar. It airs every Tuesday at 8:00pm PST. It stars Iqra Aziz, Shehzad Sheikh and Nimra Khan in lead roles. It is directed by Shaquille Khan but after 24 episodes the drama was then directed by Adeel Qamar Khan. The drama was highly rated.

Plot
The story is set  in late 1970s society, where teen marriages were quite common. Choti Si Zindagi was all about two young character, who were forced into a marriage according to the family and societal traditions. The story revolves around Urwa (played by Shehzad Sheikh), Amina (played by Iqra Aziz), and Azra (played by Nimra Khan), and their twisted love stories. An intriguing and interesting story. Urwa, an engineering student fall in love with his class fellow Azra (a rich girl who also loves him). One day Urwa's father found about them and forced Urwa to marry her chacha's daughter Amina (a 15 year old girl with childish behaviour and doesn't know any household work). After their marriage Urwa and Amina fight a lot, he teases her, Urwa's mother give Amina work which she doesn't know how to do then after some time Urwa went to his college and here Amina learns work and also got loved by her mother in law. Here Urwa hadn't told Azra about his marriage and talks to her but somewhere ignores her too. On vacations Urwa went to his house and notices that Amina has  changed and he starts falling in love with her. Then he receives a letter from Azra and leaves for Karachi to his college where Urwa meets her and he tells her that he got married. Azra leaves for England. Here Urwa got the news that his father is going to retire then in 3rd year of college Urwa decide to do a part-time job. Urwa and Sohail (best friend of Urwa who knows everything about Urwa) shifts to a renting flat. There they meet Saqia (their neighbour) who falls in love at first sight with Urwa and also gives food to him. Urwa's father realises that Urwa needs someone to take care of him , so he drops Amina to Urwa's flat. Here Saqia meets Amina and calls her Urwa's housemaid. Jealous Amina fights with Urwa. Then Saqia plans to study from Urwa and also flirts with him. This time Urwa and Amina fight a lot resulting Urwa drops Amina to her house. Then Amina's tensed parents calls Urwa's father, who visits Urwa and makes him realise his mistake and to takes him to Amina. Then Amina gets pregnant but unknowingly Urwa wasn't aware of this because Amina's illness makes him to go his in laws house. He got this news when his son Ali has been born. Then Urwa completes his engineering and is searching for job but hasn't found any because of Ali. Ali cries all night therefore Urwa can't sleep and Amina focuses more on Ali than him. Then their condition gets better and are also blessed with a baby girl. When their children are at the age of going school they face some financial problems ,but Sohail helps him as he is now a rich person. Urwa moves to  Saudi Arabia with Ameena and their kids. Later their children grow into adults and then Urwa meets Azra and remembers his college days. Series end with Urwa playing with his grandson.

Cast

 Iqra Aziz as Amina
 Shehzad Sheikh as Urwa 
 Nimra Khan as Azra Riaz
 Farah Shah as Zubaida Irfan
 Tahira Imam as Sakina Furqan
 Afraz Rasool as Sohail Bhatti
 Rashid Farooqui as Irfan
 Hiba Bukhari as Saiqa
 Shehryar Zaidi as Riaz Ahmed
 Khalid Butt as Nizami Sahab
 Mubshira Khanum as Syka's grandmother
 Bilawal Firdous as Ali (son of Urwa & Ameena)
 Alizeh Shah as Alina (daughter of Urwa and Ameena)
 Ramha Khan
 Kiran Qureshi
 Umair Butt
 Sohail Maqsood
 Neelum Gul
 Asma Saif

Release

Broadcast
The show was premiered on 27 September 2016 and aired every Tuesday at 8:00pm. The show was simultaneously broadcast on Hum Europe in UK, on Hum TV USA in USA and Hum TV Mena in UAE. All International broadcasting aired the series in accordance with their standard times.

Home media and streaming services
The show was available digitally on iflix as part of channel's contract but in 2019 but later all of its episodes were removed. It is also available for online streaming on MX Player and in July 2019, the series was made available on YouTube also.

Nominations

See also 
 List of programs broadcast by Hum TV
 2016 in Pakistani television

References

External links 
 Official website

Pakistani drama television series
2016 Pakistani television series debuts
2017 Pakistani television series endings
Urdu-language television shows
Hum TV original programming
Television series set in the 1970s